The Buff Epic Trail is an international skyrunning competition held for the first time in 2016. It runs every year in Barruera (Spain) in July. The race is valid for the Skyrunner World Series.

Races
 Buff Epic Trail, an Ultra SkyMarathon (65 km / 5,600 m elevation)
 Buff Epic Trail 42 km, a SkyMarathon (42 km / 3,200 m elevation)
 Buff Epic Trail 22 km, a half SkyMarathon (21 km / 1,879 m elevation)
 Buff Epic Trail 10 km, a Vertical Kilometer (10 km / 800 m elevation)

Buff Epic Trail 105 km

See also 
 Skyrunner World Series

References

External links 
 Official web site

Skyrunning competitions
Skyrunner World Series
Trail running competitions
Vall de Boí
Athletics competitions in Spain